Kempton Park may refer to:

 Kempton Park, Gauteng, a large town on the East Rand, South Africa
 Kempton Park, Surrey, a district in the borough of Spelthorne, Surrey, UK, adjacent to Sunbury-on-Thames
 Kempton Park Racecourse, a horse racing track in Sunbury-on-Thames
 Kempton Park railway station, a railway station in Sunbury-on-Thames
 Kempton Park Steam Engines, two very large triple-expansion steam pumping engines formerly used to supply north London with drinking water 
 Kempton Steam Railway, a 2 ft (610 mm) narrow gauge Steam Railway that opened in 2013